Diana Mkumbo Chilolo (born 14 April 1954) is a Member of Parliament in the National Assembly of Tanzania. She has been a member since 2000. She is a member of the Chama Cha Mapinduzi (CCM) party.

References

Living people
20th-century Tanzanian women politicians
Members of the National Assembly (Tanzania)
1954 births
Place of birth missing (living people)
21st-century Tanzanian women politicians